Plymouth Belvedere is a series of American automobile models made by Plymouth from 1954 until 1970. 

The Belvedere name was first used for a new hardtop body style in the Plymouth Cranbrook line for the 1951 model year. In 1954 the Belvedere replaced the Cranbrook as the top trim and became a full model line with sedans, station wagons, and convertible body styles. The Belvedere continued as Plymouth's full-sized car until 1965, when it became an intermediate, and was replaced after the 1970 model year by the Satellite, a name originally used for the top-trim level Belvederes. 

The nameplate "belvedere" is Italian for "beautiful sight" or “fair view”. Chrysler also had the Belvidere Assembly Plant in Belvidere, Illinois which began production in 1965.

Cranbrook Belvedere 1951–1953 

Introduced on March 31, the 1951 Plymouth Cranbrook Belvedere is a two-door pillarless hardtop. It was Plymouth's first such body design and was introduced in response to the 1950 Chevrolet Bel Air, and the Ford Victoria, the first two-door hardtop in the low-priced American market.

The Cranbook Belvedere was the name for the two-door hardtop version of the Cranbrook and built on the same  wheelbase. Powering the Belvedere is the Chrysler flathead  straight-6 engine with a 7.00:1 compression ratio producing  (SAE gross).

For 1952, Plymouth kept the Cranbrook Belvedere largely unchanged. The biggest alteration was to the color scheme; to further distinguish the top-level Belvedere from other Plymouths, the two tones now flowed from the roof over the beltline onto the trunk, which has been referred to as the "saddleback" treatment. Two-tone color schemes were "sable bronze" over suede, black over "mint green", and gray over blue. Overdrive was made available as optional equipment in the 1952 Plymouth. In overdrive, the engine made three revolutions for each rear wheel revolution and four without overdrive. The engine was a complete carryover from 1951. Production for 1951 and 1952 totaled 51,266 units.

The Belvedere remained a part of the Cranbrook series through the 1953 model year, which saw all Plymouth models completely restyled. Major style changes include a shorter  wheelbase, a one-piece windshield, flush rear fenders, and a lower hood line. In April 1953, Plymouths received the Hy-Drive semi-automatic transmission.

A total of 35,185 Belvederes were sold in 1953.

Full-size series

1954

The Belvedere replaced the Cranbrook as the top-line offering for 1954. Now, a separate model instead of just a two-door hardtop, it was also available as a convertible, two-door station wagon, and four-door sedan. The two-door hardtop version was now called the "Sport Coupe". The 1954 Belvederes featured full-length rocker sill moldings.

Minor styling updates adorned the carry-over body design. For the first time, small chrome tailfins appeared on the rear fenders. An entry-level nameplate was introduced, called the Plymouth Plaza sharing the same design and technology at a lower price.

In March 1954, Plymouth finally offered a fully automatic transmission, the Chrysler PowerFlite two-speed. Also new was a larger standard engine: a  I6 that was also used by the Dodge Division.

Belvedere production totaled 32,492 for the year.

1955–1956

All Plymouths underwent a major overhaul for the 1955 model year. This was the first year of Chrysler stylist Virgil Exner's "Forward Look." The Belvedere returned as top-of-the-line, and the Plaza remained the entry-level model. Chrysler promoted the all-new appearance, showing cars built at the Lynch Road Factory in a featurette movie Here.

For 1956, Plymouth styling evolved from that of the 1955s. Most notable would be the introduction of the first push-button automatic transmission to appear in an American automobile, and a more dramatic rear-end treatment highlighted by a pair of rakish tail-fins. In early 1956, the Fury joined the Belvedere line as a special-edition high-performance coupe. Belvedere remained the top full-line series through 1958. In 1956, Plymouth added seat belts.

In 1956, Chrysler's chief engineer in a public relations campaign took a Belvedere and had a Chrysler turbine engine fitted instead of the standard gasoline engine, and was driven across the US.

The 1956 models came with more V8 power upgrades, up to 180 bhp 270cid V8, 187 bhp 277cid V8, 200 bhp 277cid V8, with a 240 bhp 303cid V8 for the Fury. Tail fins featured for the first time, in what Exner described as the "Forward Look".

1957–1959

The 1957 model year had high sales for the Chrysler Corporation, and for the Plymouth line. Plymouth's design was so revolutionary that Chrysler used the slogan "Suddenly, it's 1960!" to promote the new car.

Standard on all body styles except the convertible was the "Powerflow 6" L-head engine. The convertible was only V8 powered and V8s were available in other Belvederes with an optional "Fury"  version as well as a "High-Performance PowerPAC" at extra cost. A manual transmission was standard with the push-button two-speed PowerFlite optional and the push-button three-speed TorqueFlite automatic also optional on V8 cars. The front suspension introduced Chrysler's Torsion-Aire Torsion bar suspension shared with all Chrysler products starting in 1957. In 1957, Chrysler products offered an appearance of either single or dual headlights. Plymouth installed the headlights in a facia that accommodated dual headlights while offering both single and dual lamps. This appearance can be seen with front turn signal lamps installed inboard, next to the headlight, while vehicles installed with dual headlights offered a concealed turn signal above the headlights in the headlight alcove.

The Belvedere would once again return as a top-level trim for 1958 for the last time. Styling was a continuation of the 1957 models. A big block "B" engine of 350 in3 V8 with dual four-barrel carburetors dubbed "Golden Commando" was optional on all models. For 1959, the Fury became the top range with a full array of sedans and coupes, and the Belvedere became the middle range. The Savoy became the least expensive model, and the Plaza was discontinued.

The convertible was only available in the Belvedere model between 1956 and 1958.

The 1957-58 Belvedere two-door hardtop gained notoriety from the movie Christine (1983) based on the novel by Stephen King. In the opening scene, in which the titles set as "Detroit, 1957", Christine appears near the end of the assembly line as a lone bright red car in a long line of Buckskin Beige Furys being built for the new model year (1958). (In the novel it is revealed that her first owner, Roland Lebay had ordered her with custom paint, as the standard 1958 Fury came only in beige.) For the movie, Christine was painted "toreador red" with an "iceberg white" top.

1960–1961

Starting in 1960, Belvederes got a brand-new standard inline six-cylinder engine replacing the venerable valve-in-block "flathead" six. Colloquially known as the Slant Six, it displaced , featured overhead valves, and a block that was inclined 30 degrees to the right to permit a lower hood line with maximum displacement. This engine used a single-barrel Holley carburetor, and became known for its extremely rugged construction, exceptional reliability and longevity.

Unit body construction was introduced throughout the line, though it appeared on certain Plymouths in earlier years such as the 1953 hardtop coupe. This eliminated the frame and was advertised as Unibody.

Under Chrysler president William Newberg, Virgil Exner's styling team was encouraged to go "over the top" with distinctive styling, leading the 1960 models to be popularly dubbed the "jukebox on wheels" and the 1961 models were not well-received and "unfairly maligned just for being different... the cleaner, finless look was certainly on the way in, and today the Belvedere looks distinctive." Despite being good cars in performance, handling, modest weight, and appealing interiors, sales suffered. Plymouth yielded third place in U.S. sales to the 1960 Ramblers.

Intermediate series

1962–1964

The 1962 model year full-size Plymouths were "downsized", with more compact outside dimensions. American car buyers at the time were in the thought mode of "bigger is better", and sales of these models suffered. However, the smaller Plymouth provided greater owner approval in their actual use. A Plymouth Belvedere with a six-cylinder engine and automatic transmission was compared to the intermediate-size Ford Fairlane and the compact-size Chevrolet Chevy II in an economy test by Popular Mechanics and the road test concluded that the Belvedere was "a very pleasant transportation package." Another advantage of the smaller and lighter body was in drag racing.

The 1963 and 1964 models used the same unibody platform as the 1962s, but were restyled to look longer and wider.

The 1964 Belvedere (and corresponding Fury hardtop coupes) featured a new "slant-back" roofline that proved to be popular, and sales improved significantly over the previous design.

The 1964 Belvedere was also the car used to introduce the 426 Chrysler Hemi engine, which used a canted large-valve arrangement. This was such a significant high-RPM breathing improvement that Hemi-equipped Plymouth Belvederes won first, second, and third at NASCAR's 1964 Daytona race. One of the winning drivers was Richard Petty.

1965–1967

In 1965 Plymouth once again made the Fury a full-size car, and Belvedere ostensibly became the intermediate size offering, though the Belvedere was little changed, and most dimensions and weights remained the same—the Fury was merely enlarged, restoring a full-sized line which Plymouth had been lacking. The Belvedere line was divided into the Belvedere I, Belvedere II and Satellite subseries, the latter available only as hardtop coupe and convertible, and featuring the  "LA block" V8 as standard equipment. The line was restyled in 1966, and the high-performance GTX was added in 1967.

The pilot episode for the television show Adam-12 featured a 1967 Belvedere as the standard LAPD police cruiser. 

Engines:

1968–1970

In 1968, the Belvedere - along with the rest of Chrysler's B-body offerings - was reskinned with "Coke bottle styling." The Belvedere II was dropped, but the Sport Satellite was added to the overall lineup, using the same sheet metal.

The new LA-style lightweight 318 engine was introduced this year and would remain available on the Belvedere throughout its production. The Plymouth Road Runner was introduced as a low-price, high-performance alternative to the GTX. Richard Petty won the Grand National championship in NASCAR in a Belvedere. The GTX came standard with the 440 CID engine and the Road Runner with the 383 Magnum, with the 440 six-barrel or the 426 Hemi engines optional.

The Belvedere name was dropped at the end of the 1970 model year, replaced by the Satellite name originally reserved for higher-end Belvederes. It lasted only through 1974, becoming the Fury in 1975 when the longer-wheelbase Fury model became the Gran Fury.

NASCAR

Police
Belvederes were used in police service from the late 1960s to the early 1970s, when they were replaced by the Plymouth Gran Fury. They were prominent in both the LAPD and New York Police Department.

Australian production

The Plymouth Belvedere was also produced by Chrysler Australia. The first model, based on the 1953 US Plymouth, featured a high level of Australian content, with body panels pressed in Chrysler Australia's Keswick facility in South Australia and matched with a 217.8 cubic inch (4107cc) side-valve six-cylinder engine, imported from Chrysler UK. It was produced as a four-door sedan and as a locally developed two-door coupe utility, along with similar Cranbrook and Savoy models, until it was replaced by the Chrysler Royal in 1957. The Belvedere was reintroduced to the Australian market in early 1958 when Chrysler Australia began assembling the current model Belvedere four-door hardtop which was imported from the US in knocked-down form. The 1959 model was equipped with a 318 cubic inch V8 engine and push-button automatic transmission. Chrysler Australia replaced their Plymouth Belvedere, Dodge Custom Royal and De Soto Firesweep models with the Dodge Phoenix in 1960.

Oklahoma centennial

During Oklahoma's 50th anniversary, a new 1957 Plymouth Belvedere was sealed in a concrete enclosure as a time capsule in downtown Tulsa on the grounds of the brand new county courthouse. It was unearthed June 14, 2007, during the state's centennial celebrations, and was publicly unveiled on June 15. In line with the Cold War realities of late 1950s America, the concrete enclosure was advertised as having been built to withstand a nuclear attack. The concrete enclosure, however, was not airtight and allowed water to leak in, which caused significant damage to the vehicle.

The controversial televised vehicle customizer Boyd Coddington was to have been the first to start the unburied car, had it been operable.

The car was the prize of a 1957 contest to guess the population of Tulsa in the year 2007. The winning entrant, Raymond Humbertson, guessed 384,743 versus the actual figure of 382,457. However, Humbertson died in 1979 and now only distant relatives remain.

A second car, this time a Plymouth Prowler, was encased in a vault in Tulsa's Centennial Park (formerly Central Park) in 1998 to celebrate the city's centennial. After it was discovered what had become of the 1957 Belvedere, the Prowler was moved above ground, and a mound was formed over it. It is to be revealed after the same period of time as the Belvedere, in 2048.

Notes

External links

 Allpar: Plymouth Satellite, Plymouth GTX, and Plymouth Belvedere
 View the Unburied Plymouth Belvedere
 Plymouth Belvedere in television and film
 Plymouth sales brochures at www.oldcarbrochures.com
 Members cars, page 3, The WPC Club
 "Plymouth Combination Station Wagon And Utility Vehicle" Popular Mechanics, July 1949

Belvedere
Cars introduced in 1954
1960s cars
1970s cars
Convertibles
Coupés
Full-size vehicles
Mid-size cars
Police vehicles
Rear-wheel-drive vehicles
Sedans
Station wagons